Karen Deed (born 29 October 1968) is an Australian former professional tennis player.

A right-handed player, Deed competed on the international tour during the 1980s, making main draw appearances at the Australian Open and Wimbledon.

Deed, while a student at the University of Wollongong, represented Australia at the 1991 World University Games, which were held in Sheffield, England.

ITF finals

Singles: 1 (0–1)

Doubles: 2 (1–1)

References

External links
 
 

1968 births
Living people
Australian female tennis players